Scheenstia is an extinct genus of neopterygian ray-finned fish from the Late Jurassic–Early Cretaceous of Europe. Fossils have been found in both marine and freshwater environments.

Most species of the genus were previously referred to the related genus Lepidotes, but all Late Jurassic–Early Cretaceous species of that genus have since been re-classified as Scheenstia following detailed phylogenetic analysis. It is a member of Lepisosteiformes meaning that is closest living relates are gars. The teeth of Scheenstia are low and rounded, and were likely used for crushing hard shelled organisms (durophagy). One species, the marine Scheenstia maximus from the Late Jurassic of Germany, could reach body lengths in excess of 1.5 metres.

Classification
Scheenstia is related to the genus Lepidotes, with both genera placed in the family Lepidotidae. Lepidotes has been one of the greatest actinopterygian wastebasket taxa, with one 2012 study finding species referrable to a minimum of three different and distantly related genera. Scheenstia is also related to Isanichthys. A cladogram showing the relations of Neopterygii was published in the review, and a simplified version labelling the previous species of Lepidotes is shown here.

References

Lepisosteiformes
Prehistoric ray-finned fish genera
Cretaceous bony fish
Mesozoic fish of Europe
Fossil taxa described in 2011